Gods In Polyester: A Survivors' Account Of 70's Cinema Obscura is a cult film book covering mainly American obscure, low-budget, and independent film horror, sci-fi, exploitation film, Blaxploitation, Spaghetti Western, and action films that were created between 1970 and 1981.

This book was published by Succubus Press in 2004. This publishing company was based in Amsterdam, Netherlands. The book was compiled and edited by Suzanne Donahue and Mikael Sovijärvi.

Contributors 

 Ed Adlum Invasion Of The Blood Farmers, Shriek Of The Mutilated
 Laurel Barnett The Child
 George Barry Death Bed: The Bed That Eats
 Margaret Blye Final Chapter: Walking Tall, The Sporting Club, The Machine Gun Kelly Story
 Lynn Borden Walking Tall
 Don Dohler Fiend, The Alien Factor
 Robert DoQui Coffy, Walking Tall Part II
 John P. Dulaney Squadra Antiscippo, Squadra Antitruffa, Squadra Antifurto, The Crystal Man
 T.G. Finkbinder The Redeemer
 Robert S. Fiveson Parts: The Clonus Horror
 George Buck Flower The Capture Of Bigfoot, The Alpha Incident, Tender Loving Care, Carnal Madness, Ilsa, She-Wolf of the SS, Ilsa, Harem Keeper of the Oil Sheiks, Candy Tangerine Man, Lady Cocoa, The Executioner, The Witch Who Came From The Sea, Flash And The Firecat, Drive-In Massacre
 Lawrence D. Foldes Don't Go Near The Park
 Leo Fong The Last Reunion, Ninja Assassins, Bamboo Trap, Blind Rage, Murder In The Orient
 Bruce Glover Black Gunn, Walking Tall, Walking Tall Part II, Final Chapter: Walking Tall
 Gary Graver Texas Lightning
 William Grefe Mako: Jaws Of Death, Stanley, Impulse, Whiskey Mountain
 John D. Hancock Let's Scare Jessica to Death
 Richard Harrison Beast With A Gun, Fireback, Joe Dakota, Achtung! The Desert Tigers, Boxer Rebellion, Marco Polo, Voodoo Baby, Sex Explosion, Reverendo Colt, Churchill's Leopards, Holy Water Joe, Dig Your Grave, Friend...Sabata's Coming, Black Gold Dossier
 Ron Honthaner The House on Skull Mountain
 Jack Jones The Comeback
 Donald G. Jackson Demon Lover Diary
 Bruce Kessler Simon, King of the Witches
 John Phillip Law Death In November, Ring Of Darkness, The Spiral Staircase, The Crystal Man, Whisper In The Dark
 Jeff Lieberman Squirm, Blue Sunshine, Just Before Dawn
 Ted V. Mikels The Corpse Grinders, Blood Orgy Of The She Devils, The Doll Squad
 Mel Novak Cat In The Cage, Black Belt Jones, Lovely But Deadly, The Ultimate Warrior, Game of Death, Truck Turner, Tom Horn
 Felton Perry Sudden Death, Walking Tall
 Hy Pyke Lemora, Slithis, Nightmare In Blood, Dolemite, The Amorous Adventures Of Don Quixote And Sancho Panza, The Way He Was
 Linnea Quigley Don't Go Near The Park, Graduation Day, Psycho From Texas
 Bill Rebane The Giant Spider Invasion, The Alpha Incident
 Alan Scarfe Cathy's Curse
 Ferd Sebastian ''Gator Bait William Shatner Impulse Scott Shaw The Demon Lover David Sheldon Lovely But Deadly, Sheba Baby, Just Before Dawn, Grizzly, Project: Kill Carol Speed The Mack, Abby, Savage, Bummer, The Big Bird Cage, Disco Godfather, The New Centurions, Dynamite Brothers, Black Samson
 George Stover Fiend, The Alien Factor Manuela Thiess Barn Of The Naked Dead Norman J. Warren Prey, Satan's Slave, Terror, Inseminoid Marc Wielage Satan's Children''

ISBN 

Gods In Polyester: A Survivors' Account Of 70's Cinema Obscura

External links 
 Headpress Information about the book.

Books about film